Kolbeinsá is a farm and river about 10 km long in Westfjords, Iceland.

Rivers of Iceland
Farms in Iceland